Mission City  may refer to:
 Mission, British Columbia, once known as Mission City
 Mission City station, terminus of the West Coast Express